Frederick Gregg Smith (25 December 1942 – 26 March 2020) was an English footballer who played at full back for Burnley and Portsmouth, in the 1960s and 1970s.

Football career
In October 1968, Burnley were suffering from a loss of form, causing manager Harry Potts to call up several younger players to replace the under-performing first-choice eleven. Smith was called into the team to play West Ham United, winning 3–1. With only one change, the same eleven players went on to record eight successive victories in League and Cup matches, with John Murray scoring eight goals.

In February 2009, Smith was included (at No. 60) in the list of "100 Greatest Clarets".

At Portsmouth, Smith soon became a first team regular and was ever-present in 1971–72. Smith scored his only first-team goal for Portsmouth in a 6–3 victory over Fulham in October 1971.

Smith was with Dallas Tornado in the North American Soccer League during 1974, but did not make any appearances. Returning to England, he briefly played for Halifax Town.

He died in March 2020.

References

1942 births
2020 deaths
People from Choppington
Footballers from Northumberland
English footballers
Association football defenders
Burnley F.C. players
Portsmouth F.C. players
Dallas Tornado players
Halifax Town A.F.C. players
English Football League players
English expatriate sportspeople in the United States
Expatriate soccer players in the United States
English expatriate footballers